William M. Griswold (February 7, 1823October 10, 1889) was an American lawyer, Republican politician, and Wisconsin pioneer.  He served four years in the Wisconsin State Senate and three years in the State Assembly, representing Columbia County.

Early life
Born in Salisbury, Herkimer County, New York, Griswold graduated from Union College in 1844, and studied law with Judge Arphaxed Loomis in Little Falls, New York.  He was admitted to the bar in 1850, at Schenectady, and then practiced law for three years as a junior partner to Loomis.  He moved west to Wisconsin in 1853, and settled at Columbus, in Columbia County, Wisconsin.

Career
In Columbus, he worked for several years in a mercantile trade with his older brother, George.  He then devoted himself to cultivating his farm.

Griswold was elected to three consecutive terms in the Wisconsin State Assembly, running on the Republican Party ticket.  He represented Columbia County's 2nd Assembly district, which then comprised the southeast portion of the county.

He was subsequently elected to two terms in the Wisconsin State Senate, in 1868 and 1870, representing all of Columbia County.  He declined renomination in 1872. Additionally, he was a member of the board of supervisors of Columbia County for four terms, and was chairman of the county board in 1871.

Personal life and death
William M. Griswold was the last child of Amos Griswold and his first wife Martha ( Munson).  William's older brother, George Griswold, was his business partner for several years.  Their younger half-brother, Eugene S. Griswold, came to live and work with them in Columbus, Wisconsin, in the 1850s.

William Griswold married Mary Sofied of Yates County, New York, in July 1868.  They had two children, William and Mary.

Griswold died of cancer at his home in Columbus at the age of 66.

Electoral history

Wisconsin Senate (1868, 1870)

| colspan="6" style="text-align:center;background-color: #e9e9e9;"| General Election, November 3, 1868

| colspan="6" style="text-align:center;background-color: #e9e9e9;"| General Election, November 8, 1870

References

1823 births
1889 deaths
Griswold family
People from Salisbury, Herkimer County, New York
People from Columbus, Wisconsin
Union College (New York) alumni
County supervisors in Wisconsin
Republican Party Wisconsin state senators
Republican Party members of the Wisconsin State Assembly
19th-century American politicians